The following is a list of films produced in the Kannada film industry in India in 1991, presented in alphabetical order.

References

External links
 http://www.bharatmovies.com/kannada/info/moviepages.htm
 http://www.kannadastore.com/

See also 

 Kannada films of 1990
 Kannada films of 1992

1991
Kannada
 Kannada
1991 in Indian cinema